Asit Sen may refer to:

Asit Sen (actor) (1917–1993), prolific Hindi film actor and comedian
Asit Sen (director) (1922–2001), East Bengali film director who directed several Hindi and Bengali films
Asit Sen (activist), West Bengali communist activist, founder of Revolutionary Communist Unity Centre (Marxist–Leninist)